Kenneth Harold Libo (December 4, 1937 – March 29, 2012) was an American historian of Jewish immigration who is known for working with writer Irving Howe.  In 1959, he graduated from Dartmouth College.  In 1974, he received his PhD in English literature from the City University of New York.  In 1980, he became the first English-language editor of The Jewish Daily Forward.

References

1937 births
2012 deaths